Eduardo Paret Pérez (born October 23, 1972 in Santa Clara) is a Cuban baseball player. He is a shortstop for Villa Clara of the Cuban National Series, and for the Cuban national baseball team.

Paret was the starting shortstop on the Cuban teams that won gold medals at the 1996 and 2004 Summer Olympics and second place at the 2006 World Baseball Classic. He was named most valuable player of the 2005 World Cup of Baseball after going 12 for 19 with 8 stolen bases in the tournament.

In July 1997, Paret and his Villa Clara teammates Osmani García and Angel López spoke with Cuban defector Rolando Arrojo by telephone. As a result, they were banned from Cuban baseball for "maintaining contact with baseball traitors." The ban has since been lifted.
On July 28, 2006, ESPN.com reported that Paret and Yulieski Gurriel had defected from Cuba and into Colombia.
. Days later, Gurriel denied the report.

References

External links
 

1972 births
Living people
People from Santa Clara, Cuba
Banned Cuban baseball players
Olympic baseball players of Cuba
Olympic silver medalists for Cuba
Olympic gold medalists for Cuba
Olympic medalists in baseball
Medalists at the 1996 Summer Olympics
Medalists at the 2004 Summer Olympics
Medalists at the 2008 Summer Olympics
Baseball players at the 1996 Summer Olympics
Baseball players at the 2004 Summer Olympics
Baseball players at the 2008 Summer Olympics
Pan American Games gold medalists for Cuba
Baseball players at the 1995 Pan American Games
Baseball players at the 2003 Pan American Games
Baseball players at the 2007 Pan American Games
2006 World Baseball Classic players
2009 World Baseball Classic players
Pan American Games medalists in baseball
Central American and Caribbean Games gold medalists for Cuba
Competitors at the 2006 Central American and Caribbean Games
Central American and Caribbean Games medalists in baseball
Medalists at the 1995 Pan American Games
Medalists at the 2003 Pan American Games
Medalists at the 2007 Pan American Games